Acanthocyclops is a genus of copepod crustaceans in the family Cyclopidae. It was originally described by Friedrich Kiefer as a subgenus of Cyclops, and contains the following species:

Acanthocyclops abyssicola (Lilljeborg, 1901)
Acanthocyclops agamus Kiefer, 1938
Acanthocyclops alticola (Kiefer, 1935)
Acanthocyclops americanus (Marsh, 1893)
Acanthocyclops arenosus Mazepova, 1950
Acanthocyclops balcanicus Naidenov & Pandourski, 1992
Acanthocyclops biarticulatus Monchenko, 1972
Acanthocyclops bicuspidatus (Claus, 1857)
Acanthocyclops bisetosus (Rehberg, 1880)
Acanthocyclops brachypus (Kiefer, 1955)
Acanthocyclops brevispinosus (Herrick, 1884)
Acanthocyclops caesariatus Mercado-Salas & Suárez-Morales, 2009
Acanthocyclops capillatus (Sars, 1863)
Acanthocyclops carolinianus (Yeatman, 1944)
Acanthocyclops cephallenus Pesce, 1978
Acanthocyclops chappuisi (Naidenov & Pandourski, 1992)
Acanthocyclops columbiensis Reid, 1990
Acanthocyclops crassicaudis (Sars, 1863)
Acanthocyclops crassicaudoides (Kiefer, 1928)
Acanthocyclops crinitus (Graeter, 1910)
Acanthocyclops deminutus (Sterba, 1954)
Acanthocyclops denticornis Chislenko, 1977
Acanthocyclops dussarti Pesce & Maggi, 1977
Acanthocyclops einslei Mirabdullayev & Defaye, 2004
Acanthocyclops ekmani Lindberg, 1950
Acanthocyclops elegans Mazepova, 1962
Acanthocyclops exilis (Coker, 1934)
Acanthocyclops fonticulus Lee & Chang, 2007
Acanthocyclops fontinalis Naidenov, 1969
Acanthocyclops formosanus Harada, 1931
Acanthocyclops galbinus Mazepova, 1962
Acanthocyclops gigas (Claus, 1857)
Acanthocyclops gmeineri Pospisil, 1989
Acanthocyclops gordani Petkovski, 1971
Acanthocyclops hispanicus Kiefer, 1937
Acanthocyclops hypogeus (Kiefer, 1930)
Acanthocyclops improcerus Mazepova, 1950
Acanthocyclops incolotaenia Mazepova, 1950
Acanthocyclops insectus (Forbes, 1882)
Acanthocyclops intermedius Mazepova, 1952
Acanthocyclops iskrecensis Pandourski, 1992
Acanthocyclops jasnitskii Mazepova, 1950
Acanthocyclops jeanneli (Chappuis, 1929)
Acanthocyclops kagaensis ItoTak, 1964
Acanthocyclops kieferi (Chappuis, 1925)
Acanthocyclops konstantini Mazepova, 1962
Acanthocyclops languidoides (Lilljeborg, 1901)
Acanthocyclops languidus (Sars, 1863)
Acanthocyclops latipes (Lowndes, 1927)
Acanthocyclops lobulosus (Ekman, 1905)
Acanthocyclops longifurcus Shen & Sung, 1963
Acanthocyclops macedonicus (Petkovski, 1954)
Acanthocyclops magnus (Marsh, 1920)
Acanthocyclops marceloi Mercado-Salas & Suárez-Morales, 2009
Acanthocyclops michaelseni (Mrázek, 1901)
Acanthocyclops milotai Iepure & Defaye, 2008
Acanthocyclops mirnyi Borutsky & Vinogradov, 1957
Acanthocyclops miurai ItoTak, 1957
Acanthocyclops montana Reid & Reed, 1991
Acanthocyclops morimotoi ItoTak, 1952
Acanthocyclops muscicola (Lastochkin, 1924)
Acanthocyclops nanus (Sars, 1863)
Acanthocyclops niceae Mann, 1940
Acanthocyclops notabilis Mazepova, 1950
Acanthocyclops orientalis Borutsky, 1966
Acanthocyclops parasensitivus Reid, 1998
Acanthocyclops parcus (Herrick, 1882)
Acanthocyclops parvulus Strayer, 1989
Acanthocyclops pennaki Reid, 1992
Acanthocyclops petkovskii Pesce & Lattinger, 1983
Acanthocyclops phreaticus (Chappuis, 1928)
Acanthocyclops pilosus Kiefer, 1934
Acanthocyclops plattensis Pennak & Ward, 1985
Acanthocyclops plesai Iepure, 2001
Acanthocyclops profundus Mazepova, 1950
Acanthocyclops propinquus Plesa, 1957
Acanthocyclops radevi Pandourski, 1993
Acanthocyclops rebecae Fiers, Ghenne & Suárez-Morales, 2000
Acanthocyclops reductus (Chappuis, 1925)
Acanthocyclops rhenanus Kiefer, 1936
Acanthocyclops robustus (Sars, 1863)
Acanthocyclops rupestris Mazepova, 1950
Acanthocyclops sambugarae Kiefer, 1981
Acanthocyclops sensitivus (Graeter & Chappuis, 1914)
Acanthocyclops serrani Braicovich & Timi, 2009
Acanthocyclops signifer Mazepova, 1952
Acanthocyclops similis Flössner, 1984
Acanthocyclops skottsbergi Lindberg, 1949
Acanthocyclops smithae Reid & Suárez-Morales, 1999
Acanthocyclops spongicola Mazepova, 1962
Acanthocyclops stammeri Kiefer, 1931
Acanthocyclops strimonis (Pandourski, 1994)
Acanthocyclops stygius (Chappuis, 1924)
Acanthocyclops talievi Mazepova, 1970
Acanthocyclops tenuispinalis Shen & Sung, 1963
Acanthocyclops thomasi (Forbes, 1882)
Acanthocyclops tokchokensis Kim & Chang, 1991
Acanthocyclops trajani Mirabdullayev & Defaye, 2004
Acanthocyclops troglophilus (Kiefer, 1932)
Acanthocyclops venustoides (Coker, 1934)
Acanthocyclops venustus (Norman & Scott, 1906)
Acanthocyclops vernalis (Fischer, 1853)
Acanthocyclops versutus Mazepova, 1961
Acanthocyclops viridis (Jurine, 1820)

References

Cyclopidae
Cyclopoida genera
Taxonomy articles created by Polbot